The 67th Mobil 1 Twelve Hours of Sebring Presented by Advance Auto Parts was an endurance sports car racing event held at Sebring International Raceway near Sebring, Florida, from 14–16 March 2019. The race was the second round of the 2019 WeatherTech SportsCar Championship, as well as the second round of the Michelin Endurance Cup. Action Express Racing and Wayne Taylor Racing brought home a Cadillac 1-2-3 finish for the overall honours, with the win going to the #31 crew of Eric Curran, Felipe Nasr and Pipo Derani, who won the 12 Hour race for a third time in the previous four editions. the #911 Porsche GT Team won in the GTLM class over the #66 Ford GT of Chip Ganassi Racing, LMP2 was won by Performance Tech Motorsports, and the Grasser Racing Team took a second straight victory in the GTD class, winning over fellow Lamborghini GTD team Magnus Racing, who came 2nd in only their second start as a Lamborghini team.

Background

The FIA World Endurance Championship returned to the venue for the same weekend for the first time since 2012, albeit with a few changes. The World Endurance Championship had a 1,000-mile standalone event of its own on Friday, March 15, 2019, the day before the official 12 Hours of Sebring sanctioned by IMSA, on March 16. Despite initial questions raised over whether or not two separate events of the same length could be held on the same weekend, the event was confirmed to be the sixth round of the 2018-19 FIA World Endurance Championship. Select drivers and teams, such as Corvette Racing and Chip Ganassi Racing, competed in both events back-to-back.

On 28 February 2019, IMSA released a technical bulletin regarding the Balance of Performance for the 12-hour race. In the Daytona Prototype international (DPi) class, most cars had reductions in power, with the exception of the Cadillac DPi. The Mazda RT24-P was made 10 kilograms heavier, and had fuel capacity reduction. In the GT Le Mans class (GTLM), the Ferrari 488 GTE was made 15 kilograms lighter. Despite being given a break, Ferrari GTLM team Risi Competizione decided to forgo Sebring, for concerns over the adjustment.

On March 6, 2019, the official entry list for the 12 Hours was revealed, featuring 38 cars in total. There were 11 cars in the DPi class, eight entries in GT Le Mans, 17 in GT Daytona, and a mere two entrants in the LMP2 class. Following the retirement of Christian Fittipaldi, Le Mans winner Brendon Hartley joined the Action Express Racing team in the #5 car. Matthieu Vaxivière joined Wayne Taylor Racing in their #10 Cadillac, after Toyota Gazoo Racing drivers Kamui Kobayashi and Fernando Alonso were barred from taking part in IMSA's event. In the GT Daytona class, Black Swan Racing, who had confirmed a full endurance-event program for the 2019 IMSA Season, had withdrawn as a result of team owner and driver Tim Pappas sustaining injuries from February's Bathurst 12 Hour event.

Report

Thursday practice
Due to the World Endurance Championship event taking place on Friday, the first few practice sessions for the 12 Hours of Sebring were held on Thursday. In the first practice session, Felipe Nasr and the #31 Action Express Racing Cadillac team were quickest, setting a 1:46.996. They were 0.355 seconds faster than the #6 Team Penske Acura. In GT Le Mans, Porsche and Ford were at the top of the leaderboard, with Laurens Vanthoor setting the quickest time for the #911 Porsche 911 RSR, setting a 1:56.983. He would be three tenths clear of the times from the Ford GT drivers Richard Westbrook and Joey Hand. In GT Daytona, Mario Farnbacher of the #86 Meyer-Shank Racing Acura team set the fastest time of 2:00.793, nearly half a second clear of the #73 Park Place Motorsport Porsche, driven by Patrick Long. PR1/Mathiasen Motorsports went fastest in the LMP2 class.

In free practice two, after a low-risk session from Mazda Team Joest, Olivier Pla would give them the fastest time of the weekend so far in the #55 car, a 1:46.834. He would be 0.815 seconds faster than Pipo Derani of the #31 Action Express Racing Cadillac. Acura driver Hélio Castroneves completed the top three in the DPi class. In the GT Le Mans class, Porsche GT Team were fastest once again, with #911 driver Nick Tandy setting a 1:56.991. The team were once again fastest over the two Chip Ganassi Racing Ford GTs. In GT Daytona, Bill Auberlen set the pace in the #96 Turner Motorsport BMW M6, with a 2:00.583. PR1/Mathiasen Motorsports once again set the fastest LMP2 time, with 1:52.149.

Qualifying results 

 Car number 912 was moved to the back of the GTLM field after qualifying after Laurens Vanthoor failed to bring the car to scrutineering immediately after the end of the session.

Results

References

External links

12 Hours of Sebring
12 Hours of Sebring
12 Hours of Sebring
12 Hours of Sebring